La Selva de los FamoS.O.S., was the third season of the show La Isla de los FamoS.O.S and the fifth season of Survivor to air in Spain and it was broadcast on Antena 3 from January 14, 2004 to March 10, 2004. This season took place in Brazil. With this season the tribes were initially divided into two tribes based on gender. Following the third elimination, the tribes were shuffled into the North and South teams. Along with this twist, a joker, Leticia Sabater, was added to the game following the fifth elimination and was hidden and given immunity until the merge. When the tribes merged into the one tribe following the seventh elimination there were ten contestants left in the game. When it came time for the final seven, previously eliminated contestant Laura Manzanedo was voted back in the game by her fellow contestants. Ultimately, it was Jose "Canales" Rivera, the well known bullfighter, who won this season over water polo player Miguel "Miki" Oca and singer Jose Manuel Soto and took home the €60,000 grand prize.

Finishing order

Nominations table 

: The contestants were split in two tribes, Men and Women. Women tribe won the immunity challenge.
: Men tribe won the immunity challenge.
: Women tribe won the immunity challenge.
: The contestants were split in two tribes, North and South. South tribe won the immunity challenge.
: There was a tie between Luís and Veruska, Alberto the eliminated contestant broke the tie choosing Veruska as first nominee.
: North tribe won the immunity challenge.
: North tribe won the immunity challenge.
: Leticia arrived to the jungle as new contestant and she will be immune until the merge. 
: South tribe won the immunity challenge.
: There was a triple tie and Leticia broke it choosing Mike as first nominee.
: The two tribes merged in just one tribe.
: Laura was elected by the ex-contestants to come back to the jungle.
: Miki was the leader and had to break the tie. He chose Jose Manuel as first nominee.
: The lines were open to vote for the winner.

External links
http://www.fanmania.net/laselva1.htm

Survivor Spain seasons